John Archibald (15 December 1845 – 20 May 1907) was a politician in Queensland, Australia. He was a Member of the Queensland Legislative Council.

Politics
Archibald served as a councillor on the Warwick Town Council and was mayor in 1890 and 1897.

John Archibald was appointed to the Queensland Legislative Council on 11 March 1897. A lifetime appointment, it ended with his death on 20 May 1907.
Archibald was buried in Toowong Cemetery.

Personal life
In 1904, John Archibald's daughter, Janet Mary Archibald married Edwin Fowles (also a Member of the Queensland Legislative Council).

References

Members of the Queensland Legislative Council
Burials at Toowong Cemetery
1845 births
1907 deaths
19th-century Australian politicians